Diamella cupreomicans is a species of ground beetle in the Lebiinae subfamily that can be found in China, Indonesia, Myanmar, Laos, Malaysia, and Viet Nam.

Further distribution
In China it can be found in such provinces as Guangxi, Hainan, and Yunnan, while in Indonesia it is found on Borneo, Java and Sumatra islands.

References

Beetles described in 1883
Beetles of Asia